was a Japanese mountaineer. He is known for having made the first ascent of Mount Everest's north face and the first ascent of Myanmar's Hkakabo Razi.

Biography
Ozaki was born in Kameyama in Japan's Mie Prefecture.

On May 10, 1980, Ozaki, with Tsuneo Shigehiro, made the first full ascent of the north face of Mount Everest. Later, in 1983, he made a December ascent of Everest.

In 1996, Ozaki made the first ascent of Myanmar's remote Hkakabo Razi with Myanmar climber Niyma Gyaltsen.

Ozaki died while descending Everest's south side at around 8,600 meters. He had to abort his ascent when he developed medical problems, then died during his attempt to summit Mount Everest in May 2011. He is reported to have died on May 12, 2011.

Personal life
Takashi Ozaki was married to Frederique Gely-Ozaki, who also climbed mountains with him. He had two children, daughter Sara and son Makato Ozaki.

Notable ascents
Summits:
Everest (twice: 1980 and 1983)
Broad Peak
Manaslu
Lhotse
Kangchenjunga
Makalu
Dhaulagiri 
Island Peak
Hkakabo Razi

See also
List of people who died climbing Mount Everest
List of Mount Everest summiters by number of times to the summit
List of 20th-century summiters of Mount Everest

References

1952 births
2011 deaths
Japanese summiters of Mount Everest
Japanese mountain climbers
Mountaineering deaths on Mount Everest